Ianne Ernesto Vergara Guinares (born 12 January 1988) is a New Zealand male weightlifter, competing in the 62 kg category and representing New Zealand at international competitions. He competed at 2014 Glasgow Commonwealth Games, 2018 Gold Coast Commonwealth Games and world championships, including at the 2015 World Weightlifting Championships.
Ianne now lives in the Netherlands where he works as a CrossFit- and Weightlifting coach.

Major results

References

External links

1988 births
Living people
New Zealand male weightlifters
Place of birth missing (living people)
Weightlifters at the 2014 Commonwealth Games
Weightlifters at the 2018 Commonwealth Games
Commonwealth Games competitors for New Zealand